Özcan Deniz (born 19 May 1972) is a Turkish actor, singer, composer, writer and director, who is of Kurdish descent.

Life
His family is of Kurdish origin. Deniz's family is originally from Ağrı but he was born in Ankara and grew up in Aydın. He is the nephew of a famous traditional Kurdish singer named Şakiro. He started acting during his highschool years itself in theater plays, which he wrote himself and attended local amateur theater clubs. He performed his first orchestra work in 1985 in Aydın. In 1988 he moved to Istanbul and in 1998 to Germany to pursue a music career. He was discovered by a group of producers in Munich, Germany. Deniz‘ debut album  Ağlattın Beni was released in 1992.  With the album Meleğim released in 1993, he became well known. In 1994, he released his album Beyaz Kelebeğim. In 1994, he acted in the film 'Ona Sevdiğimi Söyle' directed by Memduh Ün. After his military service he released another album called Yalan mı in 1997 and started acting in the TV series Yalan mı in the same year. In 1999, he starred in another TV series called Aşkın Dağlarda Gezer which he wrote himself too. He had the leading roles in the very popular TV series Asmalı Konak and Haziran Gecesi. Deniz both directed and wrote the screenplay for the film Ya Sonra? in 2011.

Discography

Albums 
 Yine Ağlattın Beni (1992, Prestij Müzik)
 Hadi Hadi Meleğim (1993, Prestij Müzik)
 Beyaz Kelebeğim (1994, Prestij Müzik)
 Yalan Mı? (1997, Prestij Müzik)
 Çoban Yıldızı (1998, Prestij Müzik)
 Aslan Gibi (2000, Prestij Müzik)
 Leyla (2002, Popüler Müzik)
 Ses ve Ayrılık (2004, Deniz-Spotek Production)
 Hediye (2007, Doğan Music Company)
 Sevdazede (2009, Avrupa Müzik)
 Bi Düşün (2012, Poll Production)

Singles 
 "Her Şey Değişir" (with Pamela and Fuat) (2009, Pasaj Müzik)
 "Merakımdan" (2012, Poll Production)
 "Aşk" (2019, DNZ Production)
 "Allah Büyük" (2020, DNZ Production)
 "Ben Yine Kendimle" (2020, DNZ Production)
 "Ayrıntılarda Gizli" (2020, DNZ Production)

Filmography

References

External links 
 
 

Turkish male television actors
1972 births
Living people
Turkish people of Kurdish descent
Golden Butterfly Award winners
Turkish male singers